KELE-FM is a radio station airing a country music format licensed to Mountain Grove, Missouri, broadcasting on 92.5 MHz FM.  The station is owned by Fred Dockins, through licensee Dockins Communications, Inc. KELE-FM is branded as "The Grove" and "Mountain Grove's Hometown Station."

KELE-FM broadcasts a mix of contemporary and classic country during the week. KELE-FM is an affiliate of Westwood One, CBS Radio News and Brownfield Missouri Ag News. On Saturday afternoon's Terri Clark's Country Gold airs from 2 to 6PM. Sunday's lineup includes Gaither Homecoming Radio, The Classic Country Jamboree, Sunday's Kind Of Country, Great Stuff bluegrass and Great Stuff Gospel bluegrass.

KELE-FM broadcasts local Mountain Grove High School Panther sports, including football, basketball and baseball.

References

External links

FCCInfo information on KELE-FM

Country radio stations in the United States
ELE-FM